Hosius may refer to:

Stanislaus Hosius (1504-1579), bishop of Chełmno and Warmia, cardinal and leader of the Counter-Reformation
Stanisław Józef Hozjusz (1674-1738), bishop of Przemyśl, Livonia, Kamianets-Podilskyi and Poznań
Ulrich Hosius (ca. 1455-1535), mint-master, horodniczy of Vilnius, and father of cardinal Stanislaus Hosius
Hozyusz coat of arms, used by several noble families in the Kingdom of Poland and Grand Duchy of Lithuania

See also
 Hosius (disambiguation)
 Hosius of Corduba (c. 257-359), bishop, leader of the First Council of Nicaea, and advisor of Constantine the Great